Levan Kharabadze (26 January 2000) is a Georgian professional footballer who plays as a left-back for Cypriot First Division club Pafos.

Club career
Kharabadze started his professional career in his hometown club Torpedo Kutaisi, before moving to Dinamo Tbilisi in 2014.

In January 2019, Kharabadze signed a year-and-a-half loan deal with Zürich.

In February he made his debut in Swiss Super League, playing the full 90 minutes in a 1–3 against FC St. Gallen.

In summer 2022 he moved to Pafos.

International
He made his debut for the Georgia national football team on 26 March 2019 in a Euro 2020 qualifier against Ireland, as a 65th-minute substitute for Davit Khocholava.

References

External links

2000 births
Living people
Footballers from Georgia (country)
Expatriate footballers from Georgia (country)
Georgia (country) youth international footballers
Georgia (country) international footballers
FC Dinamo Tbilisi players
Swiss Super League players
FC Zürich players
Pafos FC players
Expatriate footballers in Switzerland
Expatriate footballers in Cyprus
Association football defenders